Mandalay Pictures or Mandalay Vision is an American film production company founded on May 27, 1995, which is part of producer and businessman Peter Guber's Mandalay Entertainment. From 1997 until 2002, Lionsgate Entertainment owned a stake in Mandalay Pictures until Lionsgate gave up rights to own Mandalay Pictures. The company's mascot is a tiger.

History 
The film studio was formed at the same time as the parent company Mandalay Entertainment in 1995 by Peter Guber, who was formerly head of Sony Pictures Entertainment and The Guber-Peters Company. At first, it struck an exclusive film and television deal with Sony Pictures Entertainment, who was releasing its films through the Columbia and TriStar distribution labels.

In 1998, it was moved over from Sony to Paramount Pictures. At the same time, it struck a partnership with Lionsgate Entertainment to acquire the assets of the company. The deal did not include the television division, which remained with Sony Pictures Entertainment.

In 2002, the deal was transferred from Paramount Pictures to Universal Pictures, and launched its international sales division. In the November of the same year, it was separated from Lionsgate Entertainment.

In 2004, Ori Marmur left Mandalay Pictures, and decided to join Original Film. Ironically Original Film is producing the I Know What You Did Last Summer movies for Mandalay Pictures.

In 2007, it launched a division Mandalay Independent Pictures, and it was to focus on making independent pictures. In 2010, it became Mandalay Vision.

Films 

Here are the films produced by Mandalay.

Theatrical films

1990s

2000s

2010s

2020s

Direct-to-video and streaming films

2000s

2010s

2020s

Short films

References

External links 
 

Film production companies of the United States
Entertainment companies based in California
Companies based in Los Angeles County, California
Entertainment companies established in 1995
1995 establishments in California
Former Lionsgate subsidiaries
1997 mergers and acquisitions
2008 mergers and acquisitions